E3 ubiquitin-protein ligase BRE1B is an enzyme that in humans is encoded by the RNF40 gene.

Function 

The protein encoded by this gene contains a RING finger, a motif known to be involved in protein-protein and protein-DNA interactions. This protein was reported to interact with the tumor suppressor protein RB1. Studies of the rat counterpart suggested that this protein may function as an E3 ubiquitin-protein ligase, and facilitate the ubiquitination and degradation of syntaxin 1, which is an essential component of the neurotransmitter release machinery.

Interactions 

RNF40 has been shown to interact with STX1A.

References

Further reading 

 
 
 
 

RING finger proteins